Sisters of Avalon is the fifth studio album by American singer Cyndi Lauper. It was released in Japan on October 15, 1996 and worldwide on April 1, 1997, by Sony Music Entertainment. Thematically the album expounded on the issue of complacency and ignorance in popular culture and the discrimination of minorities, gays, and women. Songs like "Love to Hate" and "You Don't Know" address the entertainment industry and media and their corruption. "Ballad of Cleo and Joe" is a song about the double life of a cross dresser. "Say a Prayer" is about the AIDS epidemic.

The album was heavily praised by multiple music critics due to Lauper's creative growth and eclectic themes. However, the album's release was delayed and sold only 56,000 copies in the United States, according to Nielsen SoundScan. Since its release, the album has been met with continued praise including the Songwriters' Hall of Fame noting the title track as one of Lauper's key songs in her catalog.

Background and production
The title of the album is a reference to the book The Mists of Avalon by Marion Zimmer Bradley, which tells the legend of King Arthur from the point view of the female characters. The record takes a deviation from previous projects, incorporating a blend of electronica production with a variety of traditional instruments such as the guitar, zither, Appalachian dulcimer, and slide dulcimer, as well as an omnichord. There is a permeating pagan theme highlighted by the track "Mother," an ode to Gaea. Speaking to Billboard in 1997, Lauper commented: "To me, this album is a natural progression from the songs on Hat Full of Stars. I've never been more proud of a group of songs." Many of the album's tracks were written by Lauper and Jan Pulsford, who had joined Lauper's band as keyboardist for the tour promoting Hat Full of Stars (1993). Lauper told Billboard: "We were on a special journey that felt so right. Jan and I are extremely compatible collaborators".

The album was released in 1996 in Japan and in 1997 in other parts of the world. The Japanese version features a bonus track, "Early Christmas Morning". The track "Lollygagging" is a hidden track which is nothing more than Lauper and her musicians attempting to record the song "Hot Gets a Little Cold" but making a musical mistake and laughing about it.

Critical reception

Upon release, Larry Flick of Billboard wrote: "The album plays to Lauper's considerable strengths as a vocalist and her marked maturity as a songwriter, with broad stylistic leanings." David Grad of Entertainment Weekly noted: "Lauper remains an intoxicating pop siren. Her sixth album is a wonderfully eclectic affair."

Stephen Thomas Erlewine of AllMusic described the album as "varied and eclectic", adding: "While the results aren't always successful, the record is the most intriguing and rewarding album she made since True Colors." People noted the album's variety and "cutting commentary", but felt "for all her bold experimentation, Lauper seems to be trying too hard". Tracy Collins from Pittsburgh Post Gazette gave the album a favourable review and wote that the album "is an odd, gutty disc from a woman with a great sense of adventury" and lso that it is "the closest thing yet to a credible reinvention for Lauper".

Commercial performance
The album performed poorly in most markets. In the United States the album debuted at 188 on the chart dated April 19, 1997. It stayed on the chart for one week and has sold 56,000 copies to date. In an interview with Billboard, then-Epic Records VP David Massey acknowledged the challenges the record faced due to Lauper's shift in musical direction and planned for extensive touring to offset lessened support from MTV and radio.

In the UK, the album was released earlier in February 1997 and entered the chart at 59 before leaving the chart the following week. The album entered the Austrian Albums chart at its peak of 45, staying on the chart for 3 weeks. It was her first studio album to chart there since True Colors.

The album was however more successful in Japan where it peaked at 15, spending 9 weeks on the chart and was eventually certified Gold for shipment of 100,000 copies.

Track listing
All songs written by Cyndi Lauper and Jan Pulsford, unless otherwise noted.

Personnel

Cyndi Lauper – vocals, backing vocals, guitar, bass recorder, slide dulcimer, omnichord, zither
Charlie Giordano – accordion
Mark Saunders – bass guitar, acoustic and electric guitar, keyboards, drum loops and programming
Jan Pulsford – bass guitar, acoustic piano, drum programming, keyboards, synthesizer, harmonium, loops, samples
William Wittman – wah-wah guitar, additional lead guitar, rain loop
Catherine Russell – mandolin, backing vocals
Shang Shang Typhoon – Japanese banjo, percussion, backing vocals
Ron Jenkins – bass guitar

Scooter Warner – drums
Jimmy Bralower – drum machine
Larry Campbell – guitar, siturn, violin
Kat Dyson – guitar, backing vocals
Larry Etkin, Daniel Levine, Tom Malone – horn section
Nigel Pulsford – lead guitar
Geoff Daking, Allen Wentz – technical assistance
David Schnaufer – Tennessee music box

Charts
Weekly charts

Certifications

Release history

References

Cyndi Lauper albums
1996 albums
Albums produced by Mark Saunders (record producer)
Epic Records albums
Alternative rock albums by American artists
Electronica albums by American artists
Trip hop albums by American artists